Derbyshire County Cricket Club in 2011 was the cricket season when the English club Derbyshire had been playing for one hundred and forty years. There were in the second division in the County Championship, where they finished  fifth. Derbyshire was in Group A in the Clydesdale Bank 40  and in the North Group of the Friends Provident t20 and did not progress to the knockout stage in either competition.

2011 season

In the 2011 County Championship, Derbyshire were in Division 2 and finished in fifth position. Of their sixteen games, they won five and lost six, the remainder being drawn.  In the 2011 Clydesdale Bank 40, Derbyshire was in Group A in which they  won six of their twelve matches to finish third in the group. In the 2011 Friends Provident t20, Derbyshire played in the North Group and won four of their sixteen matches to finish seventh in the group.

Luke Sutton was captain. Wes Durston scored most runs and Tim Groenewald took most wickets overall.

Matches

First Class

Clydesdale Bank 40

Friends Provident T20

Statistics

Competition batting averages

Competition bowling averages

Wicket Keeping
Luke Sutton 
County Championship 	Catches  58, Stumping 2  
Clydesdale Bank 40  Catches  9, Stumping 3    
Friends Provident T20 Catches  3, Stumping  5
Thomas Poynton 
Clydesdale Bank 40  Catches  2, Stumping 1

See also
Derbyshire County Cricket Club seasons
2011 English cricket season

References

2011 in English cricket
Derbyshire County Cricket Club seasons